Walter Fürst ( 1303–17) was a legendary Swiss patriot from Uri, who contributed to establish the liberty and independence of Switzerland. According to Tschudi he represented Uri at the Rütlischwur.

See also
Werner Stauffacher
Arnold von Melchtal

References

1317 deaths
14th-century Swiss people
Year of birth unknown
14th-century people of the Holy Roman Empire